Philippe Gaston André Sence (born 1 October 1962) is a French footballer coach and former player who played as a goalkeeper. He is goalkeeper coach of the Saudi Arabia national team.

References

1962 births
Living people
People from Hazebrouck
Sportspeople from Nord (French department)
French footballers
Footballers from Hauts-de-France
Association football goalkeepers
Ligue 1 players
Ligue 2 players
FC Rouen players
Olympique Alès players
FC Girondins de Bordeaux players
FC Mulhouse players
Nîmes Olympique players
French football managers
Association football goalkeeping coaches
Le Havre AC non-playing staff
INF Vichy players
French expatriate sportspeople in Saudi Arabia
French expatriate sportspeople in Morocco